Ralph Samuel Brett (7 March 1877 – December 1947) was an English professional footballer who played as a centre forward in the Football League for West Bromwich Albion.

Personal life 
Brett served in the Royal Army Medical Corps.

Career statistics

References

1877 births
English footballers
Sportspeople from Chester
Brentford F.C. players
English Football League players
Association football forwards
Southport F.C. players
1947 deaths
West Bromwich Albion F.C. players
Wellingborough Town F.C. players
Southern Football League players
Midland Football League players
Royal Army Medical Corps soldiers
19th-century British Army personnel
Military personnel from Chester